Everlasting Love is the seventh studio album (eighth overall) by Vanessa Williams, released in the United States on January 25, 2005 by Lava Records. Produced entirely by Rob Mathes, the album contains cover versions of 1970s soul love songs except for the final track, which is an original song. Covers include notably "You Are Everything" released as a single and also "Show and Tell" and the title track "Everlasting Love".

The album received rave reviews and has sold 60,000 copies to date. The album peaked at number one hundred and fifty-nine on the Billboard 200 and number fifty-seven on the Top R&B/Hip-Hop Albums. The single "You Are Everything" became another hit for Williams, reaching number sixteen on the Hot Adult Contemporary Tracks, number five on the Hot Dance Club Play, and number four on the Hot Dance Singles Sales. It also became a major club hit that summer due to disco club mixes of the song by Junior Vasquez.

Track listing

Charts

References

2005 albums
Lava Records albums
Vanessa Williams albums
Albums produced by Rob Mathes
Covers albums